Karafs (also Romanized as Krafs) is a city in Darjazin-e Olya Rural District, Qorveh-e Darjazin District, Razan County, Hamadan Province, Iran. At the 2006 census, its population was 4,041, in 951 families.

References 

Cities in Hamadan Province